Russell E. Headlee (May 22, 1907 – May 8, 1987) is a former Democratic member of the Pennsylvania House of Representatives.

References

Democratic Party members of the Pennsylvania House of Representatives
1907 births
1987 deaths
20th-century American politicians